Bravo, My Love! is a 2011 South Korean television series starring Lee Bo-young, Lee Tae-sung and Jin Yi-han. It aired on MBC from July 2, 2011 to june 13, 2012 on Monday and Friday at 21:45 for 198 episodes.

Plot
Kang Jae-mi is the daughter of divorced parents. Her father Kang Hyung-do cheated on her mother Oh Jung-hee, which led to their divorce. He is now married to a much younger woman, Byun Joo-ri, but still has lingering feelings for his ex-wife.

Because of Hyung-do's infidelity and the trauma of breaking up their family, Jae-mi becomes skittish of smart and talented men like her father. So she ends up marrying "the obviously lacking" Han Jung-soo. But the marriage doesn't last, and Jae-mi divorces her loser husband.

Not ready to give up on their marriage, Jung-soo hires a lawyer to invalidate their divorce, the smart and sharp Byun Dong-woo. They begin as enemies, but Dong-woo falls for Jae-mi and he becomes one of her solid supporters as her success story unfolds. But she hesitates to begin a relationship with him because of his playboy past.

Cast
Lee Bo-young as Kang Jae-mi
Lee Tae-sung as Byun Dong-woo
Jin Yi-han as Han Jung-soo
Bae Jong-ok as Oh Jung-hee
Chun Ho-jin as Kang Hyung-do 
Byun Jung-soo as Byun Joo-ri
Yoon Hyun-sook as Oh Jung-shim
Ahn Sang-tae as Nam Dae-moon
Kim Soo-mi as Crystal Park
Park In-hwan as Byun Choon-nam
Park Ha-young as Kang Se-ra
Han Yeo-reum as Chae Hee-soo
Kim Yoo-bin as Nam Da-reum
Hwang Mi-seon as Soon-nyeo
Im Se-mi as Kyung-mi
Moon Hee-kyung as Sunny Park
Kwon Min-jung as Director Moon
Lee Seok-joon as Jung Se-Young
Yeom Hyun-seo as young Kang Se-ra

Cameos
Seo In-young as In-young (ep 1-3)
Park Si-eun as Nam Ji-eun
Cho Yeon-woo as Director Park
Dana as Eun Dan-bi 
Uhm Hyun-kyung as Mi-ra 
Hong Seok-cheon as Julien
Nam Hee-seok as policeman 
Nam Chang-hee as policeman 
Kim Young-ok as Da-reum's grandmother 
Song Chae-hwan as nun 
Son Seong-yoon as Kim Joo-hee 
Kwak Hyun-hwa as Na-young

Awards

References

External links
 

Korean-language television shows
2011 South Korean television series debuts
2012 South Korean television series endings
MBC TV television dramas
South Korean romance television series
South Korean comedy television series
Television series by Kim Jong-hak Production